This is a list of people with Wikipedia articles who died in motorcycle crashes.

Road crashes
The following people with biographies in Wikipedia died in road crashes involving motorcycles:

Others said to have died in motorcycle crashes: 
Bruno Agostinelli, Kevin Ash, Éric Babin, Harry Bamford, Bill Beckwith, Cedric Benson, Stefano Bianco, Calvin Blignault, Douglas Blubaugh, Cris Bolado, Thomas Bourgin, Jake Brockman, Jefri Al Buchori, Cosimo Caliandro, Leopoldo Cantancio, Tim Choate, Adam Comrie, Ryan Dallas Cook, Tom Cooper, Diogo Correa de Oliveira, Joey Dunlop, Andrea de Cesaris, Brian Drebber, William Dunlop, Colin Edwards, Arthur Fox, Pete de Freitas, Juan Garriga, Vladimir Gerasimov, Ray Gibb, Johnathan Goddard, Dovid Grossman, Nagare Hagiwara, Joi Harris, Jayson Hinder, Andriy Husin, Jay Ilagan, Michael Jackson, Anton Jeyanathan, Ismail Juma, Anatoly Khrapaty, Cornelis H. A. Koster, Davey Lambert, Lee Eon, Steve Lee, Bo Lozoff, David Macpherson, 2nd Baron Strathcarron, Germaine Mason, Howard Mudd, Oh Se-jong, Frank Pastore, David Patten, Sebastijan Pečjak, Odirlei Pessoni, Peter Pettalia, Jory Prum, Darryl Read, Ron Rector, Ed Ross, Ric Segreto, Paul Smart, Sophan Sophiaan, Thalles, Trần Phước Thọ, Mary Thom, Braian Toledo, Ranking Trevor, Thanasis Tribonias, Hans Olav Tungesvik, Davy Tweed, Giora Tzahor, Krisztián Veréb, Emili Vicente, Sanchari Vijay Sam Cooper,

Stunt crashes

Testing crashes
1896 Sylvester H. Roper Cambridge, Massachusetts. Crash preceded by or followed by heart failure.
2007 Noriyasu Numata (JPN) Okayama International Circuit
2013 Kevin Ash, journalist, killed in South Africa while testing new BMW R1200GS

See also
 Motorcycle safety
List of motorcycle deaths in U.S. by year
List of Billown Course fatal accidents
List of Daytona International Speedway fatalities
:Category:Lists of motorsport fatalities

References

Motorcycling
 Deaths
Deaths
Motorcycling